Nanus may refer to:

 Nanus (beetle), a genus of true weevils
 Susan Nanus, the scriptwriter for the 1998 A Will of their Own romantic drama TV mini-series aired on the NBC network
 Fort Nanus in Goa, India
 one of the main hybrid groups of the ornamental flower Gladiolus

See also 
 nana (disambiguation), the feminine form of the word
 Nanu (disambiguation)
 Nanum (disambiguation), the neuter form of the word